Hercules Against Rome is a 1964 peplum film directed by Piero Pierotti.

Plot 
A childhood friend enlists Hercules to protect the Roman Emperor Gordiano, who is in danger from his own mutinous Praetorian Guards. By the time the hero reaches Italy and the temporary Roman capital of Ravenna, the guards have already murdered the mild and scholarly Emperor, replacing him with their chief officer Filippo Afro. Gordiano's daughter Ulpia faces the prospect of marrying Filippo's worthless son Rezio, linking the usurper to the imperial family. Hercules undertakes to set the situation right, rescuing Ulpia and helping the great Roman general Lucio Trajano Decio seize the throne.

Cast 
Alan Steel as Hercules
Wandisa Guida as Ulpia
Livio Lorenzon as Mansurio
Daniele Vargas as Filippo Afro 
Dina De Santis as Arminia 
Tullio Altamura as  Lucillo
Carlo Tamberlani as  Emperor Gordiano
Andrea Aureli as Rosio 
Anna Arena as  Fenicia
Nello Pazzafini as Segesto
Ignazio Balsamo as Tauras 
Attilio Dottesio as Satiro
Salvatore Borghese as Mirko
Mimmo Palmara as Lucio Traiano

Release
Hercules Against Rome was released in Italy on 15 May 1964 with a 94-minute running time. On its release in the United States, it was released at an 87-minute running time.

References

Bibliography

External links

1964 films
French historical adventure films
Peplum films
Films about Heracles
Films directed by Piero Pierotti
Films set in the Roman Empire
Films scored by Angelo Francesco Lavagnino
Sword and sandal films
1960s Italian films